Sign of the Times is the fourth studio album by trance duo Cosmic Gate. It was released on March 23, 2009 in Germany. A deluxe edition was released  and included remixes of the original songs by other DJs such as Arty and Markus Schulz.

Track listings

CD and digital download
Sign of the Times
 "Open Your Heart" (7:05) (featuring Tiff Lacey)
 "London Rain" (6:06) (featuring Jan Loechel)
 "Flatline" (6:35) (featuring Kyler England)
 "Sign Of The Times" (6:08)
 "Under Your Spell" (5:24) (featuring Aruna)
 "Not Enough Time" (5:40) (featuring Emma Hewitt)
 "FAV" (6:32)
 "Trip To PD" (6:34)
 "Only Time" (4:46) (featuring Tommy Clint)
 "Arctic Sunset" (6:14)
 "Body Of Conflict" (5:14) (featuring Denise Rivera)
 "Whatever" (6:15)
 "Seize The Day" (4:55) (featuring Jan Loechel aka Jades)

CD
Sign of the Times (Deluxe Edition)
Disc 1
 "Open Your Heart" (7:05) (featuring Tiff Lacey)
 "London Rain" (6:06) (featuring Jan Loechel)
 "Flatline" (6:35) (featuring Kyler England)
 "Sign Of The Times" (6:08)
 "Under Your Spell" (5:24) (featuring Aruna)
 "Not Enough Time" (5:40) (featuring Emma Hewitt)
 "FAV" (6:32)
 "Trip To PD" (6:34)
 "Only Time" (4:46) (featuring Tommy Clint)
 "Arctic Sunset" (6:14)
 "Body Of Conflict" (5:14) (featuring  Denise Rivera)
 "Whatever" (6:15)
 "Seize The Day" (4:55) (featuring Jan Loechel aka Jades)

Disc 2
 "FAV (Arty Remix)" (6:45)
 "Open Your Heart (Steve Brian Remix)" (6:57) (featuring Tiff Lacey)
 "Seize The Day (Cold Blue Remix)" (7:16) (featuring  Jan Loechel aka Jades)
 "Not Enough Time (Raver Rework)" (7:18) (featuring Emma Hewitt)
 "Sign Of The Times (George Acosta Remix)" (8:06)
 "Not Enough Time (Club Mix)" (8:36) (featuring Emma Hewitt)
 "Not Enough Time (Sied van Riel Remix)" (8:11) (featuring Emma Hewitt)
 "Not Enough Time (Andy Duguid Remix)" (7:44) (featuring Emma Hewitt)
 "Sign Of The Times (Markus Schulz Remix)" (8:21)
 "Flatline (Kyau & Albert Remix)" (6:35) (featuring Kyler England)
 "Flatline (Wally Lopez Factomania Dub)" (8:01) (featuring Kyler England)
 "Under Your Spell (Myon & Shane 54 Remix)" (7:38) (featuring Aruna)
 "Under Your Spell (Duderstadt Remix)" (7:47) (featuring Aruna)
 "London Rain (New Club Mix)" (7:03) (featuring Jan Loechel)
 "London Rain (Stoneface & Terminal Remix)" (7:47) (featuring Jan Loechel)

Digital download
Sign of the Times (Deluxe Edition)
 "Open Your Heart" (7:05) (featuring Tiff Lacey)
 "London Rain" (6:06) (featuring Jan Loechel)
 "Flatline" (6:35) (featuring Kyler England)
 "Sign Of The Times" (6:08)
 "Under Your Spell" (5:24) (featuring Aruna)
 "Not Enough Time" (5:40) (featuring Emma Hewitt)
 "FAV" (6:32)
 "Trip To PD" (6:34)
 "Only Time" (4:46) (featuring Tommy Clint)
 "Arctic Sunset" (6:14)
 "Body Of Conflict" (5:14) (featuring  Denise Rivera)
 "Whatever" (6:15)
 "Seize The Day" (4:55) (featuring  Jan Loechel aka Jades)
 "FAV (Arty Remix)" (6:45)
 "Open Your Heart (Steve Brian Remix)" (6:57) (featuring Tiff Lacey)
 "Seize The Day (Cold Blue Remix)" (7:16) (featuring  Jan Loechel aka Jades)
 "Not Enough Time (Raver Rework)" (7:18) (featuring Emma Hewitt)
 "Sign Of The Times (George Acosta Remix)" (8:06)
 "Not Enough Time (Club Mix)" (8:36) (featuring Emma Hewitt)
 "Not Enough Time (Sied van Riel Remix)" (8:11) (featuring Emma Hewitt)
 "Not Enough Time (Andy Duguid Remix)" (7:44) (featuring Emma Hewitt)
 "Sign Of The Times (Markus Schulz Remix)" (8:21)
 "FAV (Hard Dub") (8:01)
 "Flatline (Kyau & Albert Remix)" (6:35) (featuring Kyler England)
 "Flatline (Row Remix)" (7:00) (featuring Kyler England)
 "Flatline (Wally Lopez Factomania Dub)" (8:01) (featuring Kyler England)
 "Under Your Spell (Myon & Shane 54 Remix)" (7:38) (featuring Aruna)
 "Under Your Spell (Duderstadt Remix)" (7:47) (featuring Aruna)
 "London Rain (New Club Mix)" (7:03) (featuring Jan Loechel)
 "London Rain (Stoneface & Terminal Remix)" (7:47) (featuring Jan Loechel)
 "London Rain (Ruben de Ronde Remix)" (7:09) (featuring Jan Loechel)
 "London Rain (Suspect 44 Remix)" (8:12) (featuring Jan Loechel)
 "London Rain (Back 2 Back 4 Redub)" (7:41) (featuring Jan Loechel)

References

External links
 

Cosmic Gate albums
2009 albums
Black Hole Recordings albums